Archduke Karl Albrecht of Austria-Teschen (Karl Albrecht Nikolaus Leo Gratianus von Österreich, later Karl Albrecht Habsburg-Lothringen, since 1919 – Karol Olbracht Habsburg-Lotaryński; (Pula, 18 December 1888 – Östervik, near Stockholm, 17 March 1951) was an Austrian military officer, a member of the House of Habsburg-Lorraine.

Early life and career

He was an Austrian archduke, the oldest son of Archduke Charles Stephen and Archduchess Maria Theresia, Princess of Tuscany.

He was a landowner in Żywiec, a colonel of artillery in both the Imperial Austro-Hungarian Army (cavalry) and the Polish Army, and the 1,175th knight of the Order of the Golden Fleece in 1910, etc.

In 1918 and again in 1939 he became a volunteer in the Polish army.
He fought in the Polish–Soviet War. In 1920, he commanded the Grudziądz Fortress.
During the German occupation of Poland, he declared Polish nationality and refused to sign the Volksliste. He was imprisoned in November 1939, kept in Cieszyn and tortured by the Gestapo. His wife was interned in Wisła. 
He left prison blind in one eye and half-paralyzed. In October 1942, Albrecht and his family were sent to a labor camp in Strausberg.
After liberation, he moved to Kraków and then to Sweden.
His estate was confiscated in 1939 by the invading Germans, and again in 1945 by the Polish People's Republic.

Family and children
On 8 November 1920 he married morganatically Alice Elisabeth Ankarcrona (born at Tullgarn, near Trosa, 18 December 1889 and died at Saltsjöbaden, near Stockholm, 26 November 1985) in the castle of Żywiec Poland. She was a daughter of Oscar Carl Gustav Ankarcrona and his wife, Anna Carleson. The head of the House of Habsburg-Lorraine accorded her the hereditary title of "Princess of Altenburg" on 15 December 1949.

Their children were:

 Prince Karl-Stefan of Altenburg (Balice, Poland, 29 October 1921 – Stockholm, 20 June 2018); married in Geneva, Switzerland, on 18 September 1952 his first cousin, Maria-Louise Victoria Katharina Elisabeth af Petersens (Stockholm, 4 November 1910 – Östervik, Sweden, 27 May 1998), and had issue:
 Princess Maria-Christina of Altenburg (b. Stockholm, 21 April 1953), unmarried and without issue
 Prince Karl-Albrecht of Altenburg (Stockholm, 24 October 1956 – Zürich, 26 May 1957)
 Princess Maria-Christina of Altenburg (Żywiec, 8 December 1923 – 2 October 2012, Żywiec), unmarried and without issue.
 Prince Karl-Albrecht of Altenburg (Żywiec, 4 August 1926 – 19 December 1928)
 Princess Renata of Altenburg (b. Żywiec, 13 April 1931), married in Stockholm on 26 June 1957 Spanish diplomat Eduardo de Zulueta y Dato (b. Paris, France 4 December 1923), and had issue.

Ancestry

Honours
 Order of Polonia Restituta
 Cross of Valor
 Knight of the Order of the Golden Fleece
 Iron Cross 1st & 2rd class (1914 version)

References

1888 births
1951 deaths
People from Pula
House of Habsburg-Lorraine
Polish nobility
Polish people of the Polish–Soviet War
Austro-Hungarian people of World War I
Knights of the Golden Fleece of Austria
Polish Army officers
Austro-Hungarian Army officers
Colonels (military rank)
Austrian princes